The 1962 Pacific Tigers football team represented the University of the Pacific during the 1962 NCAA University Division football season.

Pacific competed as an independent in 1962. They played home games in Pacific Memorial Stadium in Stockton, California. In their second season under head coach John Rohde, the Tigers finished with a record of five wins and five losses (5–5). For the season they were outscored by their opponents 180–187.

Schedule

Team players in the AFL/NFL
The following University of the Pacific players were selected in the 1963 NFL Draft.

The following University of the Pacific players were selected in the 1963 AFL Draft.

The following finished their college career at Pacific, were not drafted, but played in the AFL starting with the 1963 season.

Notes

References

Pacific
Pacific Tigers football seasons
Pacific Tigers football